Johan Backlund (born July 24, 1981) is a former Swedish professional ice hockey goaltender. He previously played in two National Hockey League (NHL) games with the Philadelphia Flyers during the 2009–10 season.

Playing career
On March 26, 2009, Backlund signed a one-year two-way contract with the Philadelphia Flyers.

After the 2009 training camp he was sent to the Adirondack Phantoms as Ray Emery and Brian Boucher were slated to be the Flyers goaltending tandem for the 2009-10 NHL season. Backlund was called up briefly in early October when Brian Boucher was injured but did not play before being returned to the Phantoms. After a moderate start he earned his first shutout on North American ice against the Syracuse Crunch on November 1, 2009.

On March 27, 2010, Backlund made his NHL debut against the Pittsburgh Penguins. He allowed 2 goals on 24 shots, but had to exit the game after 2 periods, having reaggravated a groin injury. The Flyers lost the game 4-1, and he got the losing decision.

On June 11, 2010, Backlund signed a two-year contract extension with the Flyers.

Career statistics

Regular season

Playoffs

References

External links
 

1981 births
Adirondack Phantoms players
HC Slovan Bratislava players
HC Vityaz players
Leksands IF players
Living people
Oulun Kärpät players
People from Skellefteå Municipality
Philadelphia Flyers players
Skellefteå AIK players
Swedish expatriate ice hockey players in the United States
Swedish ice hockey goaltenders
Timrå IK players
Trenton Titans players
Undrafted National Hockey League players
Sportspeople from Västerbotten County
Swedish expatriate ice hockey players in Finland
Swedish expatriate sportspeople in Russia
Swedish expatriate sportspeople in Slovakia
Expatriate ice hockey players in Slovakia
Expatriate ice hockey players in Russia